The close-mid front unrounded vowel, or high-mid front unrounded vowel, is a type of vowel sound, used in some spoken languages.

Features

Occurrence

See also
 Index of phonetics articles

Notes

References

External links
 

Close-mid vowels
Front vowels
Unrounded vowels